Western Pomerania is an area on the Baltic coast of Poland and Germany.

Western Pomerania may also refer to:
Duchy of Pomerania, ruled intermittently by the House of Griffin 1121–1637
Swedish Pomerania, a dominion under the Swedish Crown from 1630 to 1815
Province of Pomerania (1815–1945), a Prussian province
West Pomeranian Voivodeship, a modern Polish province
Mecklenburg-Vorpommern, a modern German state

See also 
Pomerania
Eastern Pomerania (disambiguation)
West Pomeranian dialect

Disambiguation pages to be converted to broad concept articles 
Pomerania